The 1959 Ice Hockey World Championships were held between 5 March and 15 March 1959, in Prague, and six other cities in Czechoslovakia.  Canada, represented by the Belleville McFarlands, won their 18th World championship, winning every game but their last.  The Soviet Union finished second, claiming their fifth European title followed by the host Czechoslovaks.  In the consolation round, West Germany played against East Germany for the first time in a World Championship, winning easily, 8–0. The Canadian games were broadcast on CJBQ radio by Jack Devine.

World Championship Group A (Czechoslovakia)

First round 
Twelve teams played in three groups where first and second place advanced to the final round, while the 3rd and 4th place teams competed in a consolation round.

Group 1 
Played in Bratislava.

Group 2 
Played in Brno.

Group 3 
Played in Ostrava.

Final Round 
Played in Prague.  Canada finished first by virtue of a better goal differential, 14 to 10.  The Czechoslovaks captured bronze in dramatic fashion, they needed to win against the previously undefeated Canadians in the final game and by enough of a margin to beat out the Americans on tie-breakers.  By scoring an empty net goal in the dying moments of the final game the Czechs equaled the Americans on points (6 each), and goal differential (8 each).  The final tie-breaker was goal average, in which the Czechs had the advantage 1.57 to 1.53.

Consolation round 
Played in Kladno, Mladá Boleslav and Kolín.

World Championship Group B (Czechoslovakia)
Three other nations played a secondary tournament in Plzen. A Czechoslovakia 'B' (junior) team also participated in the tournament. Had their games counted, they would've finished first.

Final Round

European Championship medal table

Tournament awards
 Best players selected by the directorate:
 Best Goaltender:  Nikolai Puchkov
Best Defenceman:  Jean Lamirande
Best Forward:  Bill Cleary

Citations

References
Championnat du monde 1959

IIHF Men's World Ice Hockey Championships
International ice hockey competitions hosted by Czechoslovakia
World Championships
Ice Hockey World Championships
Sports competitions in Prague
Sports competitions in Bratislava
Ice Hockey World Championships, 1959
Ice Hockey World Championships, 1959
Sport in Brno
Sport in Ostrava